Mario Lang (born 22 December 1988 in Bruck a. d. Mur, Styria) is an Austrian rock-singer.

He reached the fourth place in the third season of the Austrian casting show Starmania.

Biography 
Mario grew up in St. Lorenzen in Styria and visited school in Kapfenberg until he became a Starmaniac. Before he had had vocal education for two years (pop-musical).

In summer 2006 he went to the pre-castings of Starmania, where he overcame every round and reached the final of the best 12.

In the Austrian media there were many rumors, that it was planned by the Austrian television, that he should win, but in the episode from 19 January 2007 he failed and didn't reach the big final of the casting show.

After Starmania Lang signed a contract with the producer Alexander Kahr, who had worked with Christina Stürmer and Luttenberger*Klug before.

Discography

Singles

Albums 
 (2007): Mein Weg (My Way)

References 

Living people
1988 births
21st-century Austrian male singers
Starmania participants